Benjamin High School or Benjamin School is a public high school located in Benjamin, Texas (United States) and classified as a 1A school by the UIL.  It is part of the Benjamin Independent School District located in north central Knox County.  Benjamin School has all grades (K-12) in one building.   In 2015, the school was rated "Met Standard" by the Texas Education Agency.

Athletics
The Benjamin Mustangs compete in these sports - 

Football (6-man), Volleyball, Cross Country, Basketball, Golf, Tennis & Track

State Titles
Football
2022(6M/D2)

Faculty
Don Haskins: He started his coaching career at Benjamin in 1955 as a teacher and basketball coach of both boys and girls teams from 1955–56. He was the men's basketball head coach at Texas Western College (renamed the University of Texas at El Paso in 1967) from 1961 to 1999, including the 1966 season when his team won the NCAA Tournament.

See also
List of Six-man football stadiums in Texas
List of high schools in Texas

References

External links
Benjamin ISD

Schools in Knox County, Texas
Public high schools in Texas
Public middle schools in Texas
Public elementary schools in Texas